The 1944 Iowa State Cyclones football team represented Iowa State College of Agricultural and Mechanic Arts (later renamed Iowa State University) in the Big Six Conference during the 1944 college football season. In their third year under head coach Mike Michalske, the Cyclones compiled a 6–1–1 record (3–1–1 against conference opponents), finished in second place in the conference, and outscored opponents by a combined total of 203 to 39. The team shut out Kansas (25–0) and Kansas State (14–0), ran up 288 rushing yards in a 19–6 victory over Nebraska, and suffered its sole loss to Oklahoma. They played their home games at Clyde Williams Field in Ames, Iowa.

The team's statistical leaders included Meredith Warner with 260 rushing yards and 32 points scored (three touchdowns and 14 extra points), Joe Noble with 162 passing yards, and Dick Howard with 108 receiving yards.

Schedule

References

Iowa State
Iowa State Cyclones football seasons
Iowa State Cyclones football